Eminaçma is a village in the Düzce District of Düzce Province in Turkey. Its population is 243 (2022).

References

Villages in Düzce District